St Rose's Dominican College was a non-selective, Catholic Maintained, all ability, school for girls aged 11–18 years located in West Belfast, Northern Ireland. It was founded in 1961 by nuns of the Dominican order who also ran the neighbouring St Dominic's Grammar School for Girls. The college was located in the Beechmount area of the Falls Road. The school motto was Veritas, meaning truth, showing St Rose's pride in their aim for proper catholic education. It became part of All Saints College / Coláiste na Naomh Uile in 2019.

History
The foundation stone of the school was laid by the Rt Rev Monsignor James Hendley, Archdeacon, DD, PP, VG, on 30 August 1959. St Rose's board of governors held their first meeting on 27 March 1961. The school was opened officially and blessed by the Most Rev Dr Mageean exactly two years later, on 30 August 1961.

The  site was donated by the Dominican community and was situated on the old Dominican farm that had helped provide food for the convent. The Clowney River skirted around and was piped beneath the site of the new school. The school motto is Veritas, meaning truth, showing St Rose's pride in their aim for proper catholic education. The school is named for St Rose of Lima.

In 2019, St Rose's Dominican College amalgamated with Christian Brothers School, Glen Road and Corpus Christi College. The new school is called All Saints College / Coláiste na Naomh Uile.

Alumni
 Angela Feeney (born 1954) – opera singer

See also
 List of secondary schools in Belfast

References

Secondary schools in Belfast
Defunct Catholic schools in Northern Ireland
Educational institutions established in 1961
Dominican schools in the United Kingdom
Girls' schools in Northern Ireland
1961 establishments in Northern Ireland
2010s disestablishments in Northern Ireland
Educational institutions disestablished in 2019